William Michael Anthony Cecil, 8th Marquess of Exeter (born 1 September 1935), known from 1981 to 1988 as Lord Burghley, is a British peer and was w member of the House of Lords from 1988 to 1997.

Life and family
The son of Martin Cecil, 7th Marquess of Exeter, he was educated at Eton College. 

Exeter was an active member of the Emissaries of Divine Light and succeeded to its international leadership after his father's death in 1988. He left the organisation in 1996.

He made his maiden speech in the House of Lords on 16 May 1990.

Exeter is now co-director of the Ashland Institute in Ashland, Oregon.

Personal life
In 1967, Exeter married Nancy Rose Meeker; they were divorced in 1993. They have two children:
 Anthony John Cecil, Lord Burghley (born 9 August 1970)
 Lady Angela Kathleen Cecil (born 19 May 1975)

References

External links

Michael Cecil, 8th Marquess of Exeter
Profile, geni.com; Retrieved 28 March 2016.

1935 births
Living people
Barons Burghley
People educated at Eton College
Michael Cecil, 8th Marquess of Exeter
Canadian peers
Cariboo people
8

Exeter